The 2010 William & Mary Tribe football team represented The College of William & Mary in the 2010 NCAA Division I FCS football season. William & Mary competed as a member of the Colonial Athletic Association (CAA) under head football coach Jimmye Laycock and played their home games at Zable Stadium. The Tribe clinched a share of the CAA championship in the final week of the regular season. Entering Week 11, they had to defeat #18 Richmond and have #15 Villanova upset #1 Delaware, and both of those results happened. The Tribe reclaimed the Capital Cup by defeating the Spiders, 41–3, and Villanova surprised Delaware, 28–21, in overtime. William & Mary and Delaware shared the title.

William & Mary's win over Richmond in the annual Capital Cup was also their first in the series since 2004. Richmond had won five straight contests—the longest such streak for the Spiders since a five-game stretch between 1919 and 1922—and it also capped the second consecutive regular season in which the Tribe went undefeated at home. Their last home loss (including playoffs) was November 22, 2008, against Richmond.

After receiving a first round bye in the playoffs, the number two-seed Tribe fell in their first playoff game, 31–15, to Georgia Southern. The game was played at home in front of a crowd of 8,243.

Schedule

References

2010 team
2010 Colonial Athletic Association football season
William & Mary
2010 William and Mary Tribe football team
2010 in sports in Virginia